The Gulf of Koper or Koper Bay is located in the northern part of the Adriatic Sea, and is a part of the Gulf of Trieste.

Overview
The gulf, named after the city of Koper, is part of the Slovene Riviera and is entirely located in Slovenian territory. Crossed by the river Rižana, it is 18 km2 large and spans from Debeli Rtič, next to the borders with the Italian town of Muggia; to Rt Madona, a cape in the town of Piran, that is also the northernmost point of the Gulf of Piran.

The towns of Koper, Izola and Piran (the northern shore), along with the villages of Ankaran, Bertoki, Jagodje, Dobrava, Strunjan and Fiesa, are located by the gulf.

See also
 Gulf of Piran
 Gulf of Venice
 Gulf of Trieste

References

External links
Map of the Gulf of Koper (iTouchMap)

Gulfs of Slovenia
Gulf
Gulf

Gulf of Koper
Adriatic Sea